This is a list of algal fuel producers.

Asia

Iran 
 Iran started investigating the production of algae from 2000. Scientific evidence shows that south Iran is the richest area in the world for cultivating algae, because of high humidity, sunny weather, large unused area and salty water. The first version of algae based biofuel will become available for industrial purposes in 2015.
 Biofuel Research Team (BRTeam) A multi-national research team focused on various aspects of biofuel research initiated extensive research on algal genetic engineering for enhanced biodiesel production in 2010. They hoped to achieve their first genetically engineered microalgae with enhanced lipid production features in 2015.

Israel 
 In June 2008, Tel Aviv-based Seambiotic and Seattle-based Inventure Chemical announced a joint venture to use  emissions-fed algae to make ethanol and biodiesel at a biofuel plant in Ashkelon, Israel.

Japan 
 Euglena Co., Ltd.

Europe

Bulgaria 
 Greon

France 
 Alpha Biotech

Greece 
 Algae-Farms

Italy 
 Teregroup in Modena mit einer Kapazität von 3 Mio. Liter, wobei 7g Algen pro Liter erwirtschaftet werden können. Endprodukte sind neben Biodiesel auch Futtermittel und Dünger

The Netherlands 
 AlgaeLink N.V. - an international producer of algae, algae-based products and algae growing systems
 LGem B.V. - producing algae systems
 SeatechEnergy - based in the Netherlands (Hilversum) but producing algae in Denpasar (Bali, Indonesia); part of Inrada Oil & Gas
 Tomalgae (Belgium/Netherlands) - producing high value algae concentrate for use as nutritional in early stage larval shrimp and fish hatcheries

Portugal 
 AlgaFuel, S.A.
 Buggypower - one of the largest microalgae biomass production units with its own technology based on the use of closed photobioreactores

Spain 
 AlgaeLink, in Cadiz

United Kingdom 
 British Algoil Ltd 
 Varicon Aqua Solutions Ltd - an international supplier of both fresh and aquatic algae, including the supply of aquaculture-based products and algae cultivation systems

The Americas

Argentina 
 Oil Fox, Chubut, 10 T/day

Canada 
 Algabloom International, Vancouver, BC
 Centurion Biofuels, Hamilton, Ontario 
 Pond Biofuels Inc., Toronto, Ontario

Mexico 
 Recursos Renovables Alternativos

United States
There are diverse companies developing biofuels from algae:

 Algae Floating Systems, Inc.
 Algae Fuel System, Ukiah, California
 Algae Systems

 AlgaeFuel - based in Concord, California
 Algaewheel - based in Indianapolis, Indiana
 AlgalOilDiesel, LLP - based in Corvallis, Oregon
 Algenol
 Algoil Energy
 Algoil Industries, Inc.
 Applied Research Associates, Inc. - based in Albuquerque, New Mexico; algae biofuel research in Panama City, Florida office
 Aquatic Energy
 Aurora Algae (closed; formerly Aurora Biofuels)
Bio Fuel Systems
 Blue Marble Energy
 Cellana (Shell and HR BioPetroleum) 
 Chevron Corporation (in collaboration with US-DOE NREL)
 Culture Fuels
Dao Energy, LLC, a Texas-registered company with an office in Chengdu, Sichuan, China
 Diversified Energy Corporation
 Global Green Solutions
 GreenerBioEnergy
 Imperium Renewables -  formerly Seattle Biodiesel, LLC
 Inventure Chemical
 Kai BioEnergy Corp.
 Kent BioEnergy
 Live Fuels, Inc.
 Manta Biofuel, renewable crude oil
 National Remedies, San Pedro
 PetroSun and Algae BioFuels Inc., wholly owned subsidiary, in Scottsdale, Arizona
 Photon8, advanced photobioreactor, genetics, cell-viable extraction
 Phycal LLC
 Sapphire Energy, financed by the former Microsoft chairman Bill Gates
 Solazyme, Inc., supplies algae oil to Imperium Renewables; entered into a biodiesel feedstock development and testing agreement with Chevron Technology Ventures
 Solix BioSystems - in Fort Collins, Colorado
 Synthetic Genomics (ExxonMobil)
 Vertigro, a Valcent Products joint venture with Global Green Solutions, in El Paso, Texas; uses the High Density Vertical Bioreactor
 Virgin Green Fund

Oceania

Australia
 Algae.Tec - an advanced biofuels company focused on commercializing technology that produces algae to manufacture sustainable fuels such as biodiesel and green jet fuel
 Bio Fuels Pty Ltd - a Victor Smorgon Group company; developing algae biofuels technology in Victoria; oil from the algae will go into the BioMax biodiesel produced by Smorgon Fuels

New Zealand
 Aquaflow Bionomic Corporation (ABC) -  Boeing and Air New Zealand announced a joint project with Aquaflow Bionomic to develop algae. Air New Zealand eventually used jatropha biofuel as Aquaflow was unable to supply any fuel. Aquaflow  has not produced a viable method of producing jet fuel from algae.

See also
 List of biofuel companies and researchers

References

 
Lists of energy companies
Algae biofuels